Principles of Communism (German: Grundsätze des Kommunismus) is a brief 1847 work written by Friedrich Engels, the co-founder of Marxism. It is structured as a catechism, containing 25 questions about communism for which answers are provided.  In the text, Engels presents core ideas of Marxism such as historical materialism, class struggle, and proletarian revolution. Principles of Communism served as the draft version for the Communist Manifesto.

Principles of Communism was composed during October–November 1847, and was preceded by the Draft of a Communist Confession of Faith, a very similar but distinct text which Engels had previously written in June 1847.  Like Principles, the earlier Confession of Faith also used the catechism convention, but with only 22 question-answer pairs.  On Engels' recommendation, the catechism format was ultimately rejected in favor of a historical prose narrative, which was used by Karl Marx to compose the Manifesto.  All three documents were attempts to articulate the political platform of the newly-forming Communist League, a political party which was being created through the merger of two ancestors: the League of the Just, and the Communist Correspondence Committee, the latter led by Marx and Engels.  The Manifesto emerged as the best-known and final version of the Communist League's mission statement, drawing directly upon the ideas expressed in Principles.  In short, Confession of Faith was the draft version of Principles of Communism, and Principles of Communism was the draft version of The Communist Manifesto.

Background

During the early 19th century, the effects of the Industrial Revolution inspired utopian socialists to theorize improved forms of social organization based upon cooperation, as opposed to free market competition; such theorists included Robert Owen and Charles Fourier.  Additionally, radical groups sought to overthrow the existing European social order in favour of similar goals.  These parties also lamented harsh labour conditions.

One such organization was the League of the Just, which formed in 1836 by splitting off from an ancestor, the League of Outlaws, which had formed in Paris in 1834.  The League collaborated with like-minded groups to plan a violent overthrow of the existing social order, in order to bring about their own ideal society, which they referred to as the "new Jerusalem".  However, the League was not composed of industrial wage labourers or proletarians in the Marxist sense, but instead of journalists, political radicals, and craftsmen whose livelihoods were being displaced by the Industrial Revolution.  The League structured itself in chapters divided into local cells, typically of five to ten individuals.

In November 1842, Engels and Marx met each other for the first time in Cologne, at the office of the Rheinische Zeitung, a newspaper that Marx was editing at the time.  Nothing came of this first encounter, but during 1842–43, both had separately contacted the League, though neither joined.  In 1844, Engels and Marx met a second time, at the Café de la Régence in Paris.  This second meeting was the one which began their lifelong friendship and collaboration, which started with the production of The Holy Family and The German Ideology.  In 1846, Engels and Marx began their own organization, the Communist Correspondence Committee, and sought other groups for the practical application of their political goals.  Again in 1846, Marx invited the League's Paris and London branches to join as chapters of the Committee, and the League reciprocated by inviting Marx's Brussels branch of the Committee to join as a chapter of the League and to assist with political reorganization.  By early 1847, the League and the Committee had aligned.

At two important congresses during 1847 (2–9 June and 29 November-8 December), the two groups merged into one, which now called itself the Communist League.  For each of these congresses, Engels drafted versions of a political platform for the new organization.  The first version, Draft of a Communist Confession of Faith, was discussed and approved at the first June congress; Marx was not present at the June congress, but Engels was.  This first draft, unknown for many years, was rediscovered in 1968.  The second draft, Principles of Communism, was that used at the second November/December congress.  Both drafts used a catechism question-and-answer format, with which Engels had grown dissatisfied.  Immediately before the second congress, describing Principles, Engels wrote to Marx recommending a further re-draft, in historical prose:

Following the second congress of the Communist League, it commissioned Marx to write a final program.  Drawing directly upon the ideas in Principles of Communism, Marx delivered a final revision, the Manifesto, in early 1848.  Although Marx was the exclusive author of the Manifesto's manuscript, the ideas were adapted from Engels' earlier drafts, with the result that the Manifesto was credited to both authors.

Synopsis

Beginning with a definition of communism as a political theory for the liberation of the proletariat, Engels provides a brief history of the proletariat as the 19th century working class.  Ideas are developed in a sequential and logical progression, within the frame of the question-answer style.  A given question's answer implies further questions, which are phrased subsequently.

Engels explains the origins of the proletariat as a result of the Industrial Revolution.  He describes its differences from other historical poor classes, its precarious and miserable daily life, and its opposition to the owning class, or bourgeoisie.  Eventually, all people must inevitably fall into one social class or the other, with the large majority of humanity becoming proletarians.  A solution is presented: the abolition of private property.  Such abolition is now possible, where previously it was not, because of the newly existing capacity for mass production.  This productive capacity can be reorganized to provide for all on a basis of cooperation, as opposed to market competition.  Engels predicts that unfortunately, such social reorganization will have to be carried out using violence, because the bourgeoisie will not voluntarily give up its power.  Moreover, due to the global character of the Industrial Revolution, such violence must eventually and necessarily occur in all countries, not being limited to some.

When carried out on a sufficiently wide scale, Engels predicts that the abolition of private property will be a panacea for social ills, as effort previously wasted in competition will be redeployed to the benefit of all.  As a result, class and ethnic differences among humanity will gradually dissipate over time, and religion will be rendered superfluous as a historical artefact.  Engels also asserts that communism will not have harmful effects upon women or the family, as critics fear.  Quite the opposite, Engels rejects critics' fears that communism implies a "community of women", a 19th century euphemism which means that several men may have sex with a given group of women.  On the contrary, Engels asserts that such an exploitative "community of women" already exists under the existing social order, based in private property and money, which communism will overthrow: prostitution.  Engels therefore dismisses the fear as hypocritical, intimating instead that the abolition of private property will eliminate prostitution, thereby emancipating women.

Because the Communist Manifesto is a redrafting of Principles, it contains many of the same ideas.  One difference between the documents is that in the Manifesto, Marx first emphasizes historical technological development and the rise of the bourgeoisie, introducing the proletariat second, whereas in Principles, Engels began by detailing the proletariat.

Adaptation: from Confession to Principles to Manifesto

This table shows the reorganization and expansion of material which began with Engels' Confession of Faith, continued with his Principles of Communism, and which concluded with the Manifesto as re-drafted and completed by Marx.  First, the Confession of Faith's material was reorganized and slightly expanded with new matter (dash marks) to give rise to Principles.  In many cases, parallel sections of the first two drafts had identical, or near-identical text.  Since the Manifesto had both a different primary author (Marx) and a different narrative form, its redrafting process was more significant.  Effectively, Principles'  first half was rephrased as the Manifesto's  first section, its second half was rephrased as the Manifesto's second section, its penultimate question-answer pair was significantly expanded to become the Manifesto's third section, and its final question-answer pair was rephrased as the Manifesto's fourth and final brief section.

Due to their brevity, all questions are reproduced verbatim from the English translation given below.  The answers are significantly longer and therefore summarized here, except for the first, which is the shortest.

Notes

References

External links
 Full text of Principles of Communism
 Full text of Draft of a Communist Confession of Faith, the first draft of Principles of Communism
 Full text of the Communist Manifesto, the final revision of Principles of Communism
 

1847 books
1847 in politics
Books about communism
Books by Friedrich Engels